Leon Sternbach (2 July 1864, in Drohobych – 20 February 1940, in Sachsenhausen concentration camp) was a Polish philologist and classicist, professor at Jagiellonian University, and member of Polish Academy of Arts and Sciences. 

Leon Sternbach was of Jewish descent and had studied in Leipzig, Dresden and Vienna from 1882 to 1886. He initiated the study of ancient Byzantium within Poland. In 1939, two months after the German invasion of Poland, under Nazi occupation, Sternbach was arrested along with 184 other professors and staff of the Jagiellonian by the Gestapo during Sonderaktion Krakau. After being held in a Krakow Gestapo prison, he was sent to Sachsenhausen concentration camp, where he was murdered.

References

1864 births
1940 deaths
People who died in Sachsenhausen concentration camp
Academic staff of Jagiellonian University
People from Drohobych
Polish classical philologists
19th-century philologists
20th-century philologists
Polish Jews
[[Polish Jews]]
Polish people who died in Nazi concentration camps
Polish people executed in Nazi concentration camps